"Usotsuki" (ウソツキ) is a 2000 song and single by Something Else. It was the theme song of the Fuji-TV spin off movie Go-Con! starring Rina Uchiyama, and spent 12 weeks in the Oricon charts peaking at No. 24.

Track listing

 Something Else
 Be There

References

2000 singles
2000 songs